The siege of Birtvisi was the attack by the Timurid sultan, Timur, on a Birtvisi Fortress in eastern Georgia in 1403.

Battle 
The defense of the fortress was led by Ivane Toreli, who commanded 150 soldiers in addition to 30 Aznauri and their families. It took eight attempts for Timurid forces to subdue the fortress. Gates were stormed by 52 Merkit volunteers who were experts at rock climbing. Commander Ivane Toreli's wife was given to harem of Ibrahim I of Shirvan, a vassal of Timur.

References

Birtvisi
15th century in the Kingdom of Georgia
Birtvisi
Birtvisi
Birtvisi